Diamantbollen, Swedish for the Diamond Ball, an annual award for Sweden's best female football player. The award is currently awarded by the Swedish Football Association and Sydsvenskans newspaper, in conjunction with its male equivalent, Guldbollen.

Diamantbollen was first awarded in 1990 in cooperation between the Swedish Football Association and the newspaper Arbetet until 2000. Since 2001, the awards has been awarded by the Swedish Football Association and Sydsvenskan. The precursor of this award, "Årets fotbollstjej" ("Soccer Girl of the Year"), was awarded by the Swedish Football Association and Dagens Nyheter from 1980 to 1989.

Since 2002, the recipient of the award has received a blown crystal structure designed by Melanie Rydoff. The award is in the shape of a kernel with smooth concave top. At the top of the award, there is a silver leaf. The logo and player name are made by calligrapher Gun Larson.

Winners

Årets fotbollstjej award

Diamantbollen

Source:

See also
 List of sports awards honoring women

References

Women's association football trophies and awards
1990 establishments in Sweden
Awards established in 1990
Swedish sports trophies and awards

Association football player non-biographical articles